Animax was a Spanish version of anime channel Animax. It was owned by Sony. It was launched in Spain as a programming block on AXN Spain in October 2007. The channel finally launched on 12 April 2008.
Animax began as a programming block in Spain and Portugal in the channel AXN. It broadcast InuYasha, Outlaw Star, Trigun, Orphen, Excel Saga and Samurai Champloo and later broadcast Corrector Yui, The Law of Ueki, Detective Conan, Lupin III and Kochikame at weekends from 13:00 to 16:00, which began broadcasting in Portugal and Spain since October 2007 until September 2008. The channel was subsequently fully launched on 12 April 2008 on the Movistar TV and Canal+ platforms in Spain and Meo and Clix in Portugal. Among the series broadcast across Animax's networks in Spain and Portugal were Nana, Black Lagoon, Love Hina, Tsubasa: Reservoir Chronicle, Chobits, Devil May Cry. Sony Corporation announced on 4 December 2013, that the channel would cease transmission at the end of the month. The channel's programming would move to different channels in the next few weeks; by Animax's last week, it would air just a repeated loop of 2 shows, KochiKame and Yakitate!! Japan. The channel shut down for good at 11:59 PM on 31 December 2013; "Yakitate!! Japan" was the last show aired. After 3 bumpers aired between a goodbye message, it was replaced with a slide signifying the channel's shutdown.

Programming
 Insert Coin
 Naruto
 Black Lagoon
 Death Note
 Chobits
 Gunslinger Girl
 Hunter × Hunter
 Fruits Basket
 Blood+
 Samurai Champloo
 and others

See also
 Animax
 Sony
 AXN

References

External links
 Official Site
 Facebook page
 Twitter page

Animax
Defunct television channels in Spain
Sony Pictures Television
Spanish companies established in 2008
2013 disestablishments in Spain
Television channels and stations established in 2008
Television channels and stations disestablished in 2013